The 2022 ADAC GT Masters was the sixteenth season of the ADAC GT Masters, the grand tourer-style sports car racing founded by the German automobile club ADAC.

The season began at Oschersleben on April 22nd, and ended at the Hockenheimring on October 23rd.

Calendar
The preliminary calendar was announced on 4 October 2021, featuring seven double-header rounds.

Entry list

Calendar and results

Championship standings
Scoring system
Championship points are awarded for the first fifteen positions in each race. Entries are required to complete 75% of the winning car's race distance in order to be classified and earn points. Individual drivers are required to participate for a minimum of 25 minutes in order to earn championship points in any race.

Drivers' championships

Overall

† – Driver(s) did not finish the race but were classified, as they completed more than 75% of the race distance.

Junior Cup

† – Driver(s) did not finish the race but were classified, as they completed more than 75% of the race distance.

Trophy Cup

Teams' championship

† – Team did not finish the race but were classified, as it completed more than 75% of the race distance.

References

External links

ADAC GT Masters seasons
ADAC GT Masters
ADAC GT Masters